The 1962 Indian general election polls in Tamil Nadu were held for 41 seats in the state.  The result was a victory for Indian National Congress winning 31 out of 41 seats. This would mark the last time, that Congress has won more than 30 seats in this state, without the help of allies. After the defeat of Congress, in Madras, in 1967, Congress sought help and allied with local parties, to get seats in Madras/Tamil Nadu.

Voting and results

Results by Alliance

List of Elected MPs

See also 
Elections in Tamil Nadu

Bibliography 
 
Volume I, 1962 Indian general election, 3rd Lok Sabha

External links
 Website of Election Commission of India
 CNN-IBN Lok Sabha Election History

1962 elections in India
Indian general elections in Tamil Nadu